Gungahlin is one of the original eighteen districts of the Australian Capital Territory used in land administration. The Gungahlin Region is one of fastest growing regions within Australia. The district is subdivided into divisions (suburbs), sections and blocks. Gungahlin is an Aboriginal word meaning either "white man's house" or "little rocky hill".

 Gungahlin comprised sixteen suburbs, including several currently under construction and a further suburb planned. The town of Gungahlin was part of the original 1957 plan for future development in the ACT and in 1991 was officially launched as Canberra's fourth 'town' by the ACT Chief Minister. At the time, the population of Gungahlin was just 389 residents.

The town centre is one of five satellites of Canberra, seated in Woden, Tuggeranong, Weston Creek and Belconnen.

Establishment and governance
The traditional custodians of the district are the indigenous people of the Ngunnawal tribe.

Following the transfer of land from the Government of New South Wales to the Commonwealth Government in 1911, the district was established in 1966 by the Commonwealth via the gazettal of the Districts Ordinance 1966 (Cth) which, after the enactment of the Australian Capital Territory (Self-Government) Act 1988, became the Districts Act 1966. This Act was subsequently repealed by the ACT Government and the district is now administered subject to the Districts Act 2002.

During colonial times and up until the late 1960s, present-day Gungahlin was part of the former farmlands of Ginninderra. Ginninderra Village and later still the village of  serviced the needs of the local farming community. Free settlers included farming families such as the Rolfe, Shumack, Gillespie and Gribble families. These settlers established wheat and sheep properties such as 'Weetangara', 'Gold Creek', 'The Valley', 'Horse Park' and 'Tea Gardens'. Much of the local produce supplied the large workforce at goldfields located at Braidwood and Major's Creek in New South Wales.

Location and urban structure
The district is a set of contiguous residential and industrial suburbs that surround a town centre, together with undeveloped pastoral leases that border with the state of New South Wales to the north, north-east and east. The suburbs are divided from the surrounding districts of Belconnen to the west and south-west, Canberra Central to the south, Majura to the south-east, and Hall to the north-west.

Demographics
Aboriginal and Torres Strait Islander people made up 1.6 percent of the population, which was lower than the national and territory averages. The median age of people in the Gungahlin district was 32 years, which was significantly lower than the national median of 38 years. Children aged 0 – 14 years made up 23.0 percent of the population and people aged 65 years and over made up 7.2 percent of the population. Of people in the area aged 15 years and over, 54.0 percent were married and 8.9 percent were either divorced or separated.

Population growth in the Gungahlin district was 35.6 percent between the 2001 census and the 2006 census, another 50.0 percent to 2011, 50.4 percent to 2016 and another 23.2 percent to 2021. Population growth in Gungahlin district was significantly higher than the national population growth for the same periods, which amounted to 5.8%, 8.3%, 8.8% and 8.6% respectively. The median weekly income for residents within the Gungahlin district in 2021 was 48.6 percent above the national average, but slightly lower than the territory average.

In 2021, compared to the national average, households in the Gungahlin district had a significantly higher than average proportion (41.3 percent) where a non-English language was used (national average was 24.8 percent); and a significantly  lower proportion (58.0 per cent) where English only was spoken at home (national average was 72.0 percent).

List of suburbs

 Amaroo
 Bonner 
 Casey 
 Crace 
 Forde

 Franklin 
 Gungahlin
 Harrison
 Jacka 

 Kenny *
 Mitchell 
 Moncrieff 

 Ngunnawal
 Nicholls
 Palmerston
 Taylor 
 Throsby 

Asterisk indicates undeveloped suburbs as of 2022.

Transport

The primary mode of transport within the district is by private vehicle. Despite continued discussion about the preference for sustainable public transport especially light rail, Gungahlin's development is still guided by a philosophy of reliance on private personal transport and an extensive road network.

Public transport

Bus
The ACTION bus service provides public transport throughout Canberra. Services from the various suburbs generally pass through a bus interchange located at the Gungahlin Town Centre from where they connect with light rail to Civic. Some services operate direct to the Belconnen Town Centre. The Gungahlin bus interchange is located in Hibberson Street.

Light rail
A light rail network linking the Gungahlin Town Centre to Civic opened in April 2019. It is intended to address peak-hour congestion on Northbourne Avenue by encouraging public transport use.

Private transport
Private transport is the dominant mode of transport for Gungahlin commuters. The district's major arterial roads to North Canberra and the city centre are Northbourne Avenue via the Barton Highway, Horse Park Drive and Flemington Road. Gundaroo Drive-William Slim Drive is the main connection to the district of Belconnen. With the completion of the Gungahlin Drive Extension in 2008, Gungahlin commuters can bypass the city centre to reach city's southern suburbs via Gungahlin Drive and onto William Hovell Drive and the Tuggeranong Parkway.

A number of projects have improved road access to the Gungahlin district including:
 Duplication of the remaining single lane sections of the Gungahlin Drive Extension (completed 2011).
 Clarrie Hermes Drive extension to the Barton Highway (completed May 2012).
 Flemington Road was upgraded to a dual carriage way between Gungahlin Town Centre and Well Station Drive in 2010. As part of the light rail construction project, the remaining section from Well Station Drive to the Federal Highway was also duplicated, completed in 2019.

Public facilities

While the Gungahlin district is serviced by Calvary Hospital and The Canberra Hospital for emergency treatment, a number of private medical practices have established in the town centre and surrounding suburbs. The ACT Government Health Directorate also operates a Community Health Centre, providing access to allied health and outpatient services including mental health services, children's dental and nutrition, diabetes clinic, pathology collection and drug and alcohol counseling services. The clinic opened on 3 September 2012.

The Australian Capital Territory Emergency Services Agency operates the Gungahlin Joint Emergency Services Centre which provides the Gungahlin district with a local operations centre for Ambulance and Police as well as ACT Fire and Rescue and the Rural Fire Service.

Community and sports organisations
The Gungahlin Community Council is the peak community representative organisation for the district.

Gungahlin local sport teams include the Gungahlin Eagles (rugby union), the Gungahlin Bulls (rugby league), Gungahlin United (association football) and the Gungahlin Jets (Australian rules football). All four clubs play matches at Gungahlin Enclosed Oval. Gungahlin is also represented in the ACT Cricket Association by the North Canberra Gungahlin Cricket Club.

Schools
 John Paul College
 Gold Creek School
Holy Spirit Primary School
Good Shepherd Primary School
Palmerston Primary School
Amaroo School
Burgmann Anglican School
Ngunnawal Primary School
Harrison School
Gungahlin College
Mother Teresa School

References

External links

ACTMAPi - the ACT Government's interactive mapping service

Districts of the Australian Capital Territory
1966 establishments in Australia